Belle Amie is a British pop music girl group

The term belle amie is French for a female good friend.

Belle Amie or variation may also refer to:

 RTV Belle Amie, Nis, Nisava, Serbia; a TV station
 "Ma Belle Amie" (song), a 1969 single by Tee-Set off the eponymous album Ma Belle Amie
 Ma Belle Amie (album), a 1969 album containing the eponymous title track Ma Belle Amie, released by the Tee-Set
 La Belle Amie (character), a fictional character from the 1969 film The Assassination Bureau

See also

 Amy Belle, Scottish singer
 Bel Ami (disambiguation)
 Bellamy (disambiguation)